Alan Emerson Ashcraft Jr. (March 5, 1906–May 6, 1961) was an American politician and judge.

Biography
Ashcraft was born in Beloit, Wisconsin. He graduated from Deerfield Academy in Deerfield, Massachusetts. Ashcraft went to University of Vermont and tp Northwestern Pritzker School of Law. Ashcraft practiced law in Chicago, Illinois. He lived in Evanston, Illinois and served on the Evanston City Council from 1935 to 1941. Ashcraft then served in the Illinois House of Representatives from 1941 to 1945 and was involved with the Republican Party. Ashcraft served as an Illinois Superior Court judge from 1947 until his death. Ashcrafy died in a hospital in Evanston, Illinois after suffering a cerebral hemorrhage.

References

External links

Politicians from Beloit, Wisconsin
People from Evanston, Illinois
Lawyers from Chicago
Deerfield Academy alumni
Northwestern University Pritzker School of Law alumni
University of Vermont alumni
Illinois city council members
Republican Party members of the Illinois House of Representatives
Illinois state court judges
1906 births
1961 deaths
20th-century American politicians
20th-century American judges
20th-century American lawyers